Maxwell Combes (29 July 1911 – 10 March 1983) was an Australian cricketer. Born in 1911 in Greymouth, New Zealand, he played ten first-class matches for Tasmania between 1932 and 1939.

See also
 List of Tasmanian representative cricketers

References

1911 births
1983 deaths
Australian cricketers
Tasmania cricketers
Sportspeople from Greymouth